Debbie Bont (born 9 December 1990) is a Dutch handball player for Metz Handball and the Dutch national team.

She represented the Netherlands in six World Championships (in Brazil 2011, in Serbia 2013, winning silver in Denmark 2015, bronze in Germany 2017, gold in Japan 2019 and in Spain 2021), one edition of the Olympic Games and in five European Championships (in Denmark & Norway 2010, in Hungary & Croatia 2014, winning silver in Sweden 2016, bronze in France 2018 and in Denmark 2020).

References

External links

1990 births
Living people
Dutch female handball players
People from Edam-Volendam
Expatriate handball players
Dutch expatriate sportspeople in Denmark
Dutch expatriate sportspeople in France
Dutch expatriate sportspeople in Germany
FCM Håndbold players
Handball players at the 2020 Summer Olympics
Sportspeople from North Holland
21st-century Dutch women